Chettikulangara is a gram panchayat in the Mavelikkara-(6) taluk of the Alappuzha district, state of Kerala, India. Chettikulangara is "Kayamkulam" legislative assembly (108).It is an area of paddy and sesame fields, and tapioca cultivation. It has many higher secondary schools, a public health center, and a panchayat office. The panchayat is situated on the Mavelikkara-Kayamkulam road. The place is well connected to Kayamkulam, Mavelikkara, Haripad, and other nearby towns.

The Chettikulangara Devi Temple is in Chettikulangara. The Kumbha Bharani festival is conducted during February or March in the temple. The important festivity associated with this utsavam is "Kettu-Kazhcha" which resembles the Chinese festival celebrated on the birthday of Buddha. Kuthiyottam is also another important festivity.

Police Station
Mavelikara Circle↓
Erezha N
Karipuzha
Kannamangalam North
Pela
Kaitha North
Kayamkulam Circle↓
Menampally
Erezha S
Nadakkav
kaitha S
Bhagavathipadi

Hospitals
VSM Hospital, Thattarambalam
Shreekandapuram, mavelikara
Panchayat Hospital, Chettikulangara

Pachayath wards
 1 to 28

Post Offices
Chettikulangara Main (MVK-6)
Pela (MVK-3)
Erezha (MVK-6)
Kariphzha (MVK-3)
Kannamgalam South (MVK-6)

References

Cities and towns in Alappuzha district